Wolf Meissner (born  in Offenbach am Main) is a German wheelchair curler.

He participated in the 2018 Winter Paralympics where German wheelchair curling team finished on eighth place.

Teams

References

External links 
 
 
 
 
  (video)

1969 births
Living people
German male curlers
German wheelchair curlers
German disabled sportspeople
Paralympic wheelchair curlers of Germany
Wheelchair curlers at the 2018 Winter Paralympics
Sportspeople from Offenbach am Main
21st-century German people